The 1967–68 season was Newport County's sixth consecutive season in the Football League Fourth Division since relegation at the end of the 1961–62 season and their 40th overall in the Football League.

Season review

Results summary

Results by round

Fixtures and results

Fourth Division

FA Cup

League Cup

Welsh Cup

League table

References

 Amber in the Blood: A History of Newport County.

External links
 Newport County 1967-1968 : Results
 Newport County football club match record: 1968
 Welsh Cup 1967/68

1967-68
English football clubs 1967–68 season
1967–68 in Welsh football